King's Cross Central (KXC) is a multi-billion pound mixed-use development in the north-east of central London. The site is owned and controlled by the King's Cross Central Limited Partnership. The site is largely determined by three boundaries: the existing East Coast Main Line railway leading out of King's Cross; York Way, a road marking the division between Camden and Islington boroughs; and the new railway line, High Speed 1 (HS1), formerly known as the Channel Tunnel Rail Link, which curves around the site to the north and west.

The master planners for the development are Allies and Morrison, Demetri Porphyrios, and Townshend Landscape Architects. The overall developer is Argent LLP. Construction work is ongoing.

History

Background
The area of what is today Kings Cross was farmland, intersected by York Way heading north leading to a bridge which crossed the River Fleet at Battlebridge. This name led to a tradition that this was the site of a major battle between the Romans and the Iceni tribe led by Boudica (also known as Boudicea), support by writings from the ancient Roman historian Publius Cornelius Tacitus.

1820: Regents Canal

It was not until the development of New Road in 1765 (later to become Euston Road), that the development of Kings Cross began. Initially developed as terraced housing, with the opening of the Regents Canal in 1820 the area became industrialised. In 1824 the Imperial Gas Light and Coke Company developed a gas works south of the canal, which drew a number of other highly-polluting industries into the area.

1835: Kings Cross
Designed by architect Stephen Geary, the statue was constructed of bricks and mortar, and finished in a manner that gave it the appearance of stone "at least to the eyes of common spectators", allowing it to cost no more than £25. Described by George Walter Thornbury as "a ridiculous octagonal structure crowned by an absurd statue", the upper storey was used as a camera obscura while the base in turn housed a police station and a public house. The unpopular building was demolished in 1845, though the area kept the name of Kings Cross.

A structure in the form of a lighthouse was built on top of a building almost on the site about 30 years later. Known locally as the "Lighthouse Building", the popular theory that the structure was an advertisement for Netten's Oyster Bar on the ground floor seems not to be true. It is a grade II listed building.

Railway stations

1850-2: Great Northern Railway's King's Cross

In 1849, the Great Northern Railway (GNR) began development of their East Coast Main Line and station in the area. Purchasing land north of the canal for their goods yard and engine depot, they purchased land south of the canal for their King's Cross railway station. However, with the oncoming Great Exhibition, they decided to open a small temporary two-platform station within the goods area named Maiden Lane railway station. In 1852 the line was completed over the canal and Kings Cross station, designed by architect Lewis Cubitt, opened.

1856: Midland Railway's St Pancras

Before the 1860s, the Midland Railway had a network of routes in the Midlands and in south and west Yorkshire and Lancashire, but no route of its own to the capital. Up to 1857 the company had no line into London, and used the lines of the London and North Western Railway for trains into the capital; after 1857 the company's Leicester and Hitchin Railway gave access to London via the GNR. However, traffic for the second International Exhibition in 1862 suffered great delays over both lines, and so the decision was taken to develop its own London terminus from Bedford.

Initially planned to be filled with spoil from the tunnels north of the railway lands, instead the void was used for dry freight, in particular beer from the Brewers of Burton. Beer traffic was handled in the centre of the station between platforms 4 and 5.

The contract for the construction of the station substructure and connecting lines was given to Messrs. Waring, with Barlow's assistant Campion as supervisor. To avoid the foundations of the roof interfering with the space beneath, and to simplify the design and minimise cost, it was decided to construct a single span roof, with cross ties for the arch at the station level.

Construction of a hotel fronting the station, the Midland Grand Hotel, began in 1868, and it opened in 1873; the design of the hotel and station buildings was by George Gilbert Scott, selected by competition in 1865. The building is primarily brick, but polychromatic, in a style derived from the Italian gothic, and with numerous other architectural influences.

The railway lands

Both railway companies had land north of the canal, which due to their previous industrial and now commercial use became known as the "railway lands". However, the passenger stations on Euston Road far outweighed in public attention the economically more important goods traffic to the north.

The first development was the reuse of the former temporary GNR station as a potato goods shed, part of the larger local wholesale potato market. The company also added the Eastern coal drops (1851), and the later Western coal drops (1860), allowing coal shipments from the Northeast and the Midlands to be distributed around London by the canal network, and later by road.

The gas works also continued to expand, covering  by the early 1900s.

Post 1945: Decline
After World War II the area declined from being a poor but busy industrial and distribution services district to a partially abandoned post-industrial district. By the 1980s it was notorious for prostitution and drug abuse. This reputation impeded attempts to revive the area utilising the large amount of land available following the decline of the railway goods yard to the north of the station and the many other vacant premises in the area.

Redevelopment

Background

In the 1990s the government established the King's Cross Partnership to fund regeneration projects.

The result was the sale of the former Midland Railway goods depot to the west of St Pancras to the British Library. Since 1997 the main collection has been housed in this single new building, designed specially for the purpose by the architect Colin St John Wilson. Facing Euston Road is a large piazza that includes pieces of public art, such as the large sculpture of Newton by Eduardo Paolozzi (a bronze statue based on William Blake's study of Isaac Newton) and work by Antony Gormley. It is the largest public building constructed in the United Kingdom in the 20th century. In the piazza, there is also a tree which was planted in remembrance of Anne Frank.

In 1989, the London Regeneration Consortium (LRC) submitted proposals to develop the railway lands. The London Borough of Camden was "minded to grant" planning proposals for these proposals in 1994. The proposals were subsequently withdrawn.

A small section of the project, known as the "Triangle Site", falls within the boundaries of Islington. Camden Council granted outline planning permission for the main part of the site in early 2006. This has now been approved by the national government and the Mayor of London, although separate planning permission for the Triangle Site is still required from Islington Council. Islington Council initially refused planning permission. There was a public Inquiry in April 2008, where local residents from the King's Cross Railway Lands Group the Cally Rail group gave evidence against the proposed development. In July, the inquiry, the found in favour of the development.

The commencement of work on High Speed 1 in 2000 provided a major impetus for wider redevelopment. The London terminus of the Eurostar international rail service moved to St Pancras station in November 2007 with the station's redevelopment leading to the demolition of several buildings, including the Gasworks. Following the reopening of the station, redevelopment of the land between the two major stations and the old Kings Cross railway lands to the rear commenced, focussing on a major renovation and extension of Kings Cross station itself to bring it up to the same standard as newly restored St Pancras.  Meanwhile, outline planning permission was granted for the whole site which will see new housing and office developments, as well as an amphitheatre made from one of the old gasometers.

The majority of the land at King's Cross Central was used for HS1 construction purposes from July 2001 until autumn 2007. Following the opening of HS1 on 14 November 2007, and with outline planning permission, GLA (Greater London Authority) and GOL approval, the developer Argent Group PLC is now at work. Several buildings are under construction, and Central Saint Martins of the University of the Arts London has become the first occupant of new premises and one of the listed buildings.

Detailed planning applications for each part of the site are being made on a rolling programme basis. Following completion of the London 2012 Summer Olympics site, King's Cross Central is one of the largest construction projects in Greater London in the first quarter of the 21st century.

Conservation area

The majority of the site falls within two conservation areas. There are several buildings and structures of heritage value, some of which are "listed".

Current and future organisations in the area
Many organisations are affected by the decisions that will be taken by the developers. A partial list includes Camley Street Natural Park, The Cross nightclub, and St Pancras Cruising Club.

It was reported in January 2013 that Google would be acquiring a million square feet within King's Cross Central.

It was also reported in September 2014 that Havas, the Global communications group, will consolidate its existing twenty-four London offices into one new building at Three Pancras Square at Kings Cross Central.

A separate development, Kings Place, lies across the road on the East side of York Way. Network Rail and The Guardian newspaper are based there. It also includes two art galleries and concert halls.

Proposed development
King's Cross Central (KXC) has been identified in national, regional, and local policies as a high density development. It is a brownfield site (i.e. had past industrial use) with excellent public transport links. Buildings under construction at KXC range from one storey to 19 storeys. Protected views of St Paul's from Parliament Hill and Kenwood House will not be affected.

At least a third of the site (25 acres/10 hectares) will be dedicated to new public routes and open spaces. Argent proposes to create 20 new major routes and 10 new privately owned public spaces. Five of these are major new squares - Granary Square, Station Square, Pancras Square, Cubitt Square, and North Square -  which together total .

In addition, the proposals include  of new public realm along the Regent's Canal (the Gas Holders Zone and Coal Drops Yard and within a new "Cubitt Park".  Argent has invested in improvements to the canal corridor, notably lighting and access from Granary Square. About a mile along the towpath to the west is Camden Market, and beyond that Regent's Park and London Zoo; to the east is the Islington Tunnel and then Upper Street, a busy retail and entertainment area. Camley Street Natural Park, Old St. Pancras Church, and Somers Town are now connected to KXC by a footbridge, one of three new crossings over the Regent's Canal.

Social housing commitments and controversy
Argent have partnered with One Housing Group to provide rented and joint ownership housing units. A 2012 investigation by the Independent and Corporate Watch into the initial allocations found that "people with a history of mental health problems are being excluded from the social housing built there while the developers and local council have also set quotas for the number of homeless and unemployed people" at King's Cross Central's 500 social housing units.

Argent's planning permission agreement with Camden Borough council included a commitment to provide 750 affordable units in the 1,946 constructed. This is intended to include lower and middle range rents and joint ownership properties. Argent have however asked to reduce the commitment by 21 social homes and 96 mid-level rented homes in order to sell 100 extra luxury flats.

Facial recognition system controversy 
In 2019 Madhumita Murgia reported in the Financial Times that Argent was using facial recognition software in the King's Cross Central area of London. The development around London's King's Cross mainline station includes shops, offices, Google's UK HQ and part of St Martin's College. Murgia told the BBC Argent had refused to give any detailed information about how the system was used and what kind of watch list was involved. The ICO said: "Scanning people's faces as they lawfully go about their daily lives, in order to identify them, is a potential threat to privacy that should concern us all." Elizabeth Denham, the UK Information Commissioner launched an investigation into the use of the King's Cross facial recognition system. "This is inherently a surveillance tool that bends towards authoritarianism," said Silkie Carlo of Big Brother Watch. Facial recognition software has also been used at Meadowhall shopping centre in Sheffield, the World Museum in Liverpool and Millennium Point complex in Birmingham.

Transport links

King's Cross/St Pancras is already served by six London Underground lines (the Northern, Piccadilly, Victoria, Circle, Metropolitan and Hammersmith & City), by Thameslink, Midland Main Line, East Coast Main Line, and Eurostar. These services, coupled with the ability to access each of the four main airports in the South East (Heathrow, Gatwick, Stansted and Luton airports), make King's Cross the most accessible transport interchange in London. There have been HS1-related works to the London Underground system, in particular works to construct a new Northern Ticket Hall, which opened in 2009. A new Western Ticket Hall was opened to the public on 28 May 2006. Network Rail has redeveloped King's Cross station, relocating the ticket hall and other functions from the former temporary structure which fronted the Euston Road.

See also
York Central - similar railway lands brownfield regeneration site, beside York railway station.

References

Further reading
 
 Pre publication version Edwards, Michael (2009) King’s Cross: renaissance for whom?, in (ed Punter, John) Urban Design, Urban Renaissance and British Cities, London: Routledge, chapter 11

External links

Developer
King's Cross Development Forum, a group providing the community response to developments
Local newsletter
King's Cross Railway Lands Group (Webarchive, group closed in 2013)
Local directory
About the project of King's Cross Central redevelopment in 2013

Redevelopment projects in London
Districts of the London Borough of Camden
Districts of the London Borough of Islington
Privately owned public spaces
New Classical architecture